Craig Hodgson (8 July 1968 - 30 September 1998) was an international speedway rider from Australia.

Speedway career 
Hodgson won the bronze medal at the Australian National Championships. The following year in 1989 he became the Australian Junior champion. Also in 1989 he finished in 10th place during the 1989 Speedway Under-21 World Championship. In 1992, he was the Australian Longtrack champion.

He rode in the top tier of British Speedway from 1987 to 1993, riding for Peterborough Panthers and Bradford Dukes.

Death
He died in 1998 after taking his own life.

References 

1968 births
1998 deaths
Australian speedway riders
Bradford Dukes riders
Peterborough Panthers riders
Sportspeople from Adelaide